Culture, Theory and Critique is a quarterly peer-reviewed academic journal primarily in the fields of Social Theory and Cultural Studies.

Abstracting and indexing 
Culture, Theory and Critique is abstracted and indexed in:

 Scopus
 ABC-Clio
 America History & Life
 Historical Abstracts
 Humanities International Index
 International Bibliography of the Social Sciences
 MLA International Bibliography
 OCLC

References

External links

Routledge academic journals
English-language journals
Quarterly journals
Sociology journals
Cultural journals
Social philosophy journals
Anthropology journals